Clube Desportivo Recreativo Penelense is a Portuguese sports club from Penela.

The men's football team plays in the Honra B AF Coimbra. The team played in the 2012–13 Terceira Divisão and contested the Taça de Portugal the same year.

References

Football clubs in Portugal
Association football clubs established in 1933
1933 establishments in Portugal